Trachylepis ferrarai, also known commonly as Ferrara's mabuya, is a species of skink, a lizard in the family Scincidae. The species is endemic to Somalia.

Etymology
The specific name, ferrarai, is in honor of Italian zoologist Franco Ferrara, who studies isopods.

Habitat
The preferred natural habitat of T. ferrarai is forest.

Description

Reproduction
The mode of reproduction of T. ferrarai is unknown.

References

Further reading
Bauer AM (2003). "On the identity of Lacerta punctata Linnaeus 1758, the type species of the genus Euprepis Wagler 1830, and the generic assignment of Afro-Malagasy skinks". African Journal of Herpetology 52 (1): 1–7. (Trachylepis ferrarai, new combination).
Lanza B (1978). "Mabuya ferrarai, a new scincoid lizard from Somalia". Monitore Zoologico Italiano Supplemento 11 (12): 271–280.
Lanza B (1990). "Amphibians and reptiles of the Somali Democratic Republic: checklist and biogeography". Biogeographia 14: 407–465. (Mabuya ferrarai, pp. 424, 446).

Trachylepis
Skinks of Africa
Reptiles of Somalia
Endemic fauna of Somalia
Reptiles described in 1978
Taxa named by Benedetto Lanza